The Roman Catholic Archdiocese of Yaoundé is the Metropolitan See for the Ecclesiastical province of Yaoundé in Cameroon.

History
 March 18, 1890: Established as Apostolic Prefecture of Cameroun from the Apostolic Vicariate of Two Guineas in Gabon 
 January 2, 1905: Promoted as Apostolic Vicariate of Cameroun 
 April 3, 1931: Renamed as Apostolic Vicariate of Yaoundé
 September 14, 1955: Promoted as Metropolitan Archdiocese of Yaoundé

Special churches
The seat of the metropolitan archbishop is the Cathédrale Notre Dame des Victoires in Yaoundé.  There is also a Minor Basilica at Mary Queen of the Apostles Basilica in Yaoundé.

Bishops

Ordinaries, in reverse chronological order
 Metropolitan Archbishops of Yaoundé (Roman rite), below
 Archbishop Jean Mbarga 2014-
 Archbishop Simon-Victor Tonyé-Bakot 2003-2013
 Archbishop André Wouking 1998 – 2002
 Archbishop Jean Zoa 1961 – 1998
 Archbishop René Graffin, C.S.Sp. 1955 – 1961; see below
 Vicars Apostolic of Yaoundé (Roman rite), velow
 Bishop René Graffin, C.S.Sp. 1943 – 1955; see above
 Bishop François-Xavier Vogt, C.S.Sp. 1931 – 1943; see below
 Vicars Apostolic of Cameroun (Roman rite), below
 Bishop François-Xavier Vogt, C.S.Sp. 1923 – 1931: see above
 Bishop Franziskus Hennemann, S.A.C. 1914 – 1922, appointed Prefect of Cape of Good Hope, Central District {Capo di Buona Speranza, Distretto Centrale}, South Africa
 Bishop Heinrich Vieter, S.A.C. 1904 – 1914

Coadjutor vicars apostolic
Franziskus Xaver Hennemann, S.A.C. (1913-1914)
René Marie Graffin, C.S.Sp. (1931-1943)

Auxiliary bishops
Paul Etoga (1955-1961), appointed Bishop of Mbalmayo
Jean-Baptiste Ama (1974-1983), appointed Bishop of Sangmélima
Christophe Zoa (2006-2008), appointed Bishop of Sangmélima

Other priests of this diocese who became bishops
Jean-Marie Benoît Balla, appointed Bishop of Bafia in 2003
Joseph Befe Ateba, appointed Bishop of Kribi in 2008
Dieudonné Espoir Atangana (priest here, 1986–1987), appointed Bishop of Nkongsamba in 2012

Suffragan Dioceses
 Bafia
 Ebolowa
 Kribi
 Mbalmayo
 Obala
 Sangmélima

See also
 Roman Catholicism in Cameroon

Sources
 GCatholic.org

Yaounde
Yaoundé
Yaounde
Yaounde
A